Terrell Edwin "Ted" Daffer (September 24, 1929 – March 1, 2006) was an American football player.  He played college football for the Tennessee Volunteers football team at the guard position from 1949 to 1951.  He was selected by the American Football Coaches Association, the Associated Press, the Football Writers Association of America and the International News Service (INS) as a first-team guard on the 1950 College Football All-America Team. The following year, he was again selected by the INS and the Newspaper Enterprise Association as a first-team player on the 1951 All-America Team.  Daffer was selected by the Chicago Bears in the 21st round of the 1952 NFL Draft.  After two years of service in the United States Army, he played for the Bears during the 1954 NFL season. He later played for the Ottawa Rough Riders in the Canadian Football League.

References 

1929 births
2006 deaths
Tennessee Volunteers football players
Chicago Bears players
Ottawa Rough Riders players
American football guards
Players of American football from Norfolk, Virginia
Players of Canadian football from Norfolk, Virginia
United States Army soldiers